Govindarajan may refer to

C. Govindarajan, Indian politician
Durai Govindarajan, Indian politician
Govindarajan Padmanabhan, Indian biochemist
Sirkazhi Govindarajan, Tamil Carnatic musician
Mirudhubashini Govindarajan, Indian women's health care and infertility expert
Vijay Govindarajan (born 1949), professor.